Richie Sharma (born 11 November 1996) is an English cricketer. He made his Twenty20 debut on 12 January 2020, for Sri Lanka Ports Authority Cricket Club in the 2019–20 SLC Twenty20 Tournament.

References

External links
 

1996 births
Living people
English cricketers
Kalutara Town Club cricketers
British Asian cricketers
British sportspeople of Indian descent
Cricketers from Greater London